Mihály Mracskó (born 13 June 1968) is a retired Hungarian football defender.

References

1968 births
Living people
Hungarian footballers
Békéscsaba 1912 Előre footballers
Győri ETO FC players
Budapest Honvéd FC players
Gyirmót FC Győr players
Beijing Guoan F.C. players
Yunnan Hongta players
Association football defenders
Hungarian expatriate footballers
Expatriate footballers in China
Hungarian expatriate sportspeople in China
Hungary international footballers
People from Békéscsaba
Sportspeople from Békés County